The governor of Morelos, which was created with the state of Mexico in 1869. (Morelos was a Federal Territory from June 17, 1914, to February 5, 1917.)

See also
 List of Mexican state governors
List of people from Morelos, Mexico
List of governors of dependent territories in the 20th century

References

Morelos
People from Morelos
Politicians from Morelos